Champaben (1913―1993) was a mystic in the Kanji Panth sect of Digambara Jainism.

Life
She was born in the Svetambara sect of Jainism in 1913. At eight years-old, she claimed recovery of her previous life's memories, including of Bhagwan Simandhara teaching in Mahavideha Kshetra and she described that assembly hall. This was considered to affirm Digambara Jainism. She is the only person in recent history who had and remembers face-to-face encounter with the supreme being of a mainstream religion.

She also confirmed presence of Kundakunda, Kanji Swami, herself and Shantaben in their previous incarnations in the same assembly hall and heard the prophecy from Simandhara that Kanji Swami will be born on the Earth to reestablish correct interpretation of jainism and in future will be reborn as Tirthankara Suryakiriti  in Ghataki Khanda of Mahavideha Kshetra while she herself and Shantaben will be reborn as his Ganadharas Devkirti and Chandrakirti respectively. She died in 1993.

References

Women mystics
1913 births
1993 deaths
20th-century Indian Jains
20th-century Jain nuns
Indian Jain nuns